Valdosta High School is a public high school located in Valdosta, Georgia, United States.

School
Valdosta High School serves grades 9-12 in the Valdosta City School District.

Valdosta High School is a public school located in VALDOSTA, GA. It has 2,238 students in grades 9-12 with a student-teacher ratio of 17 to 1. According to state test scores, 28% of students are at least proficient in math and 32% in reading. 

Valdosta High School is ranked 140th within Georgia. Students have the opportunity to take Advanced Placement® coursework and exams. The AP® participation rate at Valdosta High School is 31%. The total minority enrollment is 84%, and 95% of students are economically disadvantaged. Valdosta High School is the only high school in the Valdosta City.

Valdosta High School has a graduation rate of 90% as of 2022.

Athletics

Football
Valdosta High School is home to the high school football program with the most wins in the United States, with a record 975 wins, 237 losses, and 34 ties as of the 2022 season. From 1913-2022, the Wildcats have won six national championships in football, 24 state championships, and 42 regional championships.  

Valdosta High plays its home games at Bazemore-Hyder Stadium located behind Valdosta State University Campus. Cross-town rival Lowndes High School has also built a strong program, winning five state titles (1980, 1999, 2004, 2005 and 2007). Since 1968, the Wildcats' record against Lowndes County is 37-24 with 0 ties, scoring an average of 20.9 ppg as compared to Lowndes County's 10.1 ppg. The Wildcats, however, had a dry run, losing seven straight until their 21-17 come-from-behind victory in 2011.

In the summer of 2008, due in part to the successes of the Valdosta High School athletic programs, Valdosta was featured on ESPN as a candidate for TitleTown USA.  This was a month-long segment on ESPN that started in the spring of 2008 and continued through July.  Fans nominated towns and cities across the country based on their championship pedigree. A panel reviewed the nominees and fan voting in May determined the 20th finalist. SportsCenter visited each city in July, and fan voting July 23–27 determined the winner. On July 28, 2008, ESPN named Valdosta as Titletown, United States.

During the 2020 season, the head coach was Rush Propst, formerly at Colquitt County High School in Moultrie, Georgia and Hoover High School in Hoover, Alabama. Propst was put on probation in early 2021 for controversy about paying players for their housing costs. After determining five players were ineligible, the Georgia High School Association fined the Wildcats $7500 and banned the team from playing in the 2021 postseason. The Netflix reality television series Titletown High highlights the team's 2020 season.

The current head coach, Shelton Felton is in his second season at Valdosta. Felton went 8-2 in the regular season and 2-2 in region 1-7A with a defeat over their rivals The Lowndes High Vikings 13-6. Felton will return for the 2023-2024 football season. The season opener they will fly to Ohio to play a historical high school football game.

Golf
The boys' golf team at Valdosta High won six consecutive state championships in the 1950s. Valdosta won three state titles in Class A (1954, 1955, 1956), two in Class AA (1957, 1958), and one title in Class AAA (1959).  The Valdosta High School golf team won their seventh state championship in 2014 as they claimed the Class AAAAAA title. The golf team has won eight region championships (1959, 1961, 1970, 1977, 1978, 2002, 2003, 2014).

The girls' golf team has also been region champions four times (2000, 2002, 2004, 2005).

Wrestling
Under Coach John Robbins, The Valdosta Wildcats brought home the 2018-2019 Dual and Traditional State Championships, with Freshman Noah Pettigrew winning the 195lb weight class. This is the first time in history the wrestling team has brought home a state championship in either Duals or Traditional.

Official GHSA State Titles
Baseball (1) - 1978(3A) 
Boys' Basketball (1) - 1948(B) 
Girls' Basketball (2) - 1957(2A), 1961 (3A) 
Football (22) - 1951(A), 1952(A), 1953(A), 1956(2A), 1957(2A), 1960(3A), 1961(3A), 1962(3A), 1965(3A), 1966(3A), 1968(3A), 1969(3A), 1971(3A), 1978(4A), 1982(4A), 1984(4A), 1986(4A), 1989(4A), 1990(4A), 1992(4A), 1998(4A), 2016(6A) 
Boys' Golf (6) - 1954(A), 1955(A), 1956(A), 1957(2A), 1958(2A), 1959(3A) 
Boys' Tennis (1) - 1991(4A; singles format) 
Girls' Tennis (1) - 1981(4A) 
Girls' Track (2) - 1980(4A), 1981(4A) 
Duals Wrestling (1) - 2019(6A) 
Traditional Wrestling (1) - 2019(6A)

Other GHSA State Titles
Literary (6) - 1950(B), 1951(A), 1952(A), 1953(A), 1955(A), 1956(A)

GIAA State Titles
Football (2) - 1940(B), 1947(B)

Claimed & Unofficial State Titles
Football (1) - 1920,

Notable alumni
 Buck Belue - football and baseball player; sports radio personality
 Luther Blue 72-73 Played for Detroit Lions 
 John Bond - four-year starting quarterback at Mississippi State
 Dusty Bonner -Kentucky Wildcats football quarterback, later played for Valdosta State Blazers and eventually NFL for the Atlanta Falcons and Arena Football League
 Dana Brinson - former NFL player
 Ellis Clary - former professional baseball player (Washington Senators, St. Louis Browns)
 Buck Coats - former professional baseball player (Chicago Cubs, Cincinnati Reds, Toronto Blue Jays)
 William "Red" Dawson - only surviving coach of the 1970 Marshall tragedy, chronicled in the documentary Marshall University: Ashes to Glory and dramatized in the movie We Are Marshall
 Willie Gary - St. Louis Rams NFL player, played in Super Bowl XXXVI
 DL Hall - professional baseball player and former first round pick
 Noah Langdale - president of Georgia State University 1957-1988
Zakoby McClain - football player for the Auburn Tigers, NFL draft prospect
 Malcolm Mitchell - football player, former Georgia Bulldog college player, former New England Patriot NFL player and Super Bowl LI champion
 Todd Peterson (born 1970) -  former NFL player
 Charles Ramsey - saved three kidnapped girls
 Stan Rome - former Kansas City Chiefs NFL player
 Coleman Rudolph - football player, former Georgia Tech college player, New York Giants and New York Jets NFL player
Sonny Shroyer - actor, best known for playing Deputy Enos Strate on The Dukes of Hazzard and Coach Paul "Bear" Bryant in Forrest Gump. Shroyer played tackle for the VHS Wildcats.

References

External links

Valdosta High School
Valdosta Football website

Public high schools in Georgia (U.S. state)
Schools in Lowndes County, Georgia